Daniel Lascelles may refer to:

 Daniel Lascelles (1655–1734), English landowner and politician
 Daniel Lascelles (1714–1784), English landowner and politician, grandson of above
 Daniel Lascelles (diplomat) (1902–1967), British diplomat

See also
 Daniel Lassalle (born 1965), trombonist